Invisible hand is a term used by Adam Smith to describe the basis of the self-regulating nature of the marketplace.

Invisible hand may also refer to:

Invisible Hand (TV series), a 1960s and 1970s Polish public television series
Invisible Hand (Star Wars), the flagship of General Grievous in Star Wars: Episode III – Revenge of the Sith
The Invisible Hand (play), a 2012 play by Ayad Akhtar
The Invisible Hand (serial), a 1920 American silent film serial
"The Invisible Hand" (The Spectacular Spider-Man), a television episode

See also 
 Invisible Hands (disambiguation)
 The Other Invisible Hand, a 2007 economics book by Julian Le Grand